Symphony No. 2 in A major, subtitled Im Frühling or In Spring, is the second symphony by American composer John Knowles Paine.

History

The symphony was composed in 1879 and published in Boston in 1880, at a time when few American composers were able to find publishers for symphonic works. It was also premiered in Boston in 1880, and was extremely well received, prompting handkerchief-waving and shouting at the first performance. Historian Louis Elson compared its final movement to Robert Schumann's Symphony in B flat, which is also subtitled "Spring".

Instrumentation

2 Flutes
2 Oboes
2 A Clarinets
2 Bassoons
4 Horns
2 Trumpets
2 Trombones
1 Bass Trombone
Timpani
Strings

Structure

The symphony is in four movements:

 Adagio sostenuto - "Departure of Winter" Allegro ma non troppo "Awakening of Nature"
 Scherzo Allegro "May-Night Fantasy"
 Adagio "A Romance of Springtime"
 Allegro giojoso "The Glory of Nature"

Use in film and television

The second and third movements were heard and shown performed at a concert in the fourth episode of the first season of the HBO television series The Gilded Age, depcting a performance in New York City in 1882.

References

External links

Paine 02
1879 compositions
Compositions in A major